Permission to Kill, also known as The Executioner, is a 1975 spy thriller film made by Sascha-Verleih and distributed by AVCO Embassy Pictures. It was directed by Cyril Frankel and produced by Paul Mills from a screenplay by Robin Estridge. The film had original music by Richard Rodney Bennett and the cinematography was by Freddie Young.

The film stars Dirk Bogarde, Ava Gardner and Bekim Fehmiu with Timothy Dalton, Nicole Calfan and Frederic Forrest.

The film is an Austrian-British-American co-production and was shot at the Sievering Studios in Vienna and on location in Gmunden, Austria.

Plot 
British agents try to stop a communist returning home from the West.

Partial cast 
Dirk Bogarde as Alan Curtis
Ava Gardner as Katina Petersen
Bekim Fehmiu as Alexander Diakim
Timothy Dalton as Charles Lord
Nicole Calfan as Melissa Lascade
Frederic Forrest as Scott Allison
John Levene as Adams
 Klaus Wildbolz as Muller
 Anthony Dutton as Jennings
 Peggy Sinclair as Lily
 Dennis Blanch as Brewer
 Alf Joint as MacNeil
 Vladimir Popovic as Kostas
 Ratislav Plamenac as Pavlos
 Oliver Schott as François
 Erna Riedl as Mme Diderot
 Paul Maxwell as American
 John Serret as Frenchman
 Anthony Forwood as Englishman
 François Baudet as Dr. Giraud
 Bob Sessions as Pete
 Peter Garell as Carlo
 Friedrich Mönnig as Cliff
 Fritz von Friedl as 1st Security Man
 Erwin Fischer as 2nd Security Man

References

External links 
 

1975 films
American spy thriller films
British spy thriller films
Austrian thriller films
English-language Austrian films
1970s thriller films
Films scored by Richard Rodney Bennett
Films set in Austria
Films shot in Austria
Embassy Pictures films
Films shot at Sievering Studios
1970s spy thriller films
Films directed by Cyril Frankel
1970s English-language films
1970s American films
1970s British films